Radio 1 Breakfast, also known as The Radio 1 Breakfast Show, is a radio show that is broadcast across the UK on BBC Radio 1.  It is hosted by Greg James since 20 August 2018 as the show's 16th presenter.

The show ran six days a week until February 1968 (see BBC Genome Project), then five days a week until June 2018, when the Friday show was dropped and incorporated into the station's weekend schedule, hosted by Weekend Breakfast hosts Matt Edmondson and Mollie King. In January 2021, the show returned to broadcasting five days per week.

History
The first breakfast show presenter was Tony Blackburn, who spoke the first words on Radio 1 and remained in the slot for nearly six years. Other DJs who have hosted the breakfast show for more than five years are former hosts Nick Grimshaw, Mike Read, Simon Mayo, and Chris Moyles. Moyles was the longest-serving Radio 1 breakfast show presenter, having hosted Radio 1's The Chris Moyles Show for eight years from 2004 to 2012.

Data supplied by the BBC Genome Project.

Nick Grimshaw (2012–2018)
Nick Grimshaw replaced Moyles as host of the breakfast show on 24 September 2012. Features included Call or Delete, a game carried on from his previous show on Radio 1, where celebrity guests chose to either prank call a contact on their phone or delete their number altogether. Other segments included The Nixtape, which saw Grimshaw select 30 minutes of party-oriented music before a DJ came in to mix listener requests to close the week on Friday mornings, Happy Monday, a half-hour of uplifting songs on Monday mornings, Showquizness, an irreverent daily quiz based around pop culture, Happy Hardcore FM, which saw listeners phone into the show to scream over happy hardcore beats, and the daily Waking Up Song, which featured celebrities encouraging listeners to get out of bed to the sound of Pharoahe Monch. Grimshaw's incarnation of the breakfast show received strong critical reviews, but polarised public opinion, which was reflected in the show's often fluctuating listening figures – in February 2015, the show had 5.9 million listeners, with a small increase in listenership of 100,000. On 26 October 2017, it was reported that the show recorded 4.93 million weekly listeners between July and September – down from 5.5 million last quarter, a record low. The Newsbeat news and sport bulletins were presented by Tina Daheley at 6:30, 7:00, 7:30, 8:00, 8:30 and 9:30; there was also entertainment news from Sinead Garven at approximately 7:45 each morning.

Greg James (2018–present)
Greg James replaced Grimshaw as host of the breakfast show on 20 August 2018. Roisin Hastie read the bulletins for Newsbeat every half-hour except at 09:00 until her departure from the show in 2022 for maternity leave, when she was replaced by Calum Leslie. Features include Yesterday's Quiz and the Ten Minute Takeover, alongside Game of Phones and Unpopular Opinions.

In March 2020, due to the COVID-19 pandemic, Radio 1 Breakfast was moved to 7am until 11am. Adele Roberts' Early Breakfast Show was extended by thirty minutes until 7am. Scott Mills, Chris Stark and Clara Amfo rotated their shows every week between 11am and 3pm and Nick Grimshaw started his show at the earlier time of 3pm. The measures took place in order to help BBC Radio 1 promote social distancing and to limit the number of staff allowed in the studio. The show was then reduced to 3 hours (i.e. 7am until 10am) since 29 June 2020, in which 10am until 11am was allocated for Radio 1 Anthems, also with Greg James. The changes took place until 31 August 2020.

Starting 1 September 2020, the schedule reverted to its 3 hours 30 minutes length, but running from 7am until 10:30am, instead of 6:30am until 10am as previously. In November 2020, Radio 1 announced that James's Breakfast show be broadcast five days a week from the start of January 2021.

Stand-ins
Holiday cover is usually provided by another prominent member of the Radio 1 presenting team – the job rarely goes to an outsider. Although in 1985, Noel Edmonds covered the programme for 2 weeks when then presenter Mike Read was on holiday. Additionally, transitions between regular hosts have often been bridged by stand-ins. These have been:

Adrian John covered the period between Mike Read's departure and Mike Smith's arrival in April 1986.
Mark Goodier covered the period between Mike Smith's departure and Simon Mayo's arrival in May 1988.
Bruno Brookes covered the period between Mark Goodier's departure and Steve Wright's arrival in December 1993.
Simon Mayo covered the period between Chris Evans's departure and the arrival of Mark Radcliffe and Marc Riley in February 1997.
Scott Mills covered the period between Zoe Ball's departure and Sara Cox's arrival in March 2000, again in December 2003 (sharing with Emma B) preceding Sara Cox's departure and Chris Moyles' arrival, and again in September 2012 after Chris Moyles's departure and before Nick Grimshaw's arrival. He most recently covered in August 2018 in the transition period between the tenures of Nick Grimshaw's departure and Greg James's arrival.
Adele Roberts, Scott Mills, Clara Amfo, Jordan North and Arielle Free covered Greg James during the period during Hide and Seek 2019 (24–25 July 2019).
Scott Mills and Chris Stark took over the breakfast show during the giant jigsaw challenge, which saw Greg James removed from the studio for the event from 20 July to 25 July 2022.

Current cover presenters
Matt Edmondson
Mollie King (co-hosts with Edmondson)
Jamie Laing (co-hosts with Edmondson)

Occasional cover presenters 

Adele Roberts
 Arielle Free
 Clara Amfo
 Vick Hope and Jordan North

Previous cover presenters
 Vernon Kay
 Dev
 Huw Stephens
 Sara Cox
 Kevin Greening
 Chris Moyles
 Scott Mills and Chris Stark

See also 
 Radio 1's Weekend Breakfast Show
 The Radio 2 Breakfast Show
 Timeline of breakfast radio programmes in the UK

References

External links

Radio 1 Breakfast Show Presenters
BBC Radio 1 programmes
British radio breakfast shows
British music radio programmes